Hibbertia marginata, commonly known as bordered guinea flower, is a species of flowering plant in the family Dilleniaceae and is endemic to the North Coast of New South Wales. It is a spreading shrub with hairy young branches, oblong to lance-shaped leaves and yellow flowers with thirty to forty stamens and many staminodes arranged around three hairy carpels.

Description
Flowering occurs in September and October.

Taxonomy
Hibbertia marginata was first formally described in 1990 by Barry Conn in the journal Muelleria from specimens collected in 1987.

Distribution and habitat
Bordered guinea flower grows in the grassy understorey of forest in the Richmond Range of north-eastern New South Wales.

Conservation
This hibbertia is classified as "vulnerable" under the Australian Government Environment Protection and Biodiversity Conservation Act 1999 and the New South Wales Government Biodiversity Conservation Act 2016. The main threats to the species are land clearing, road maintenance and inappropriate fire regimes. This was one of eleven species selected for the Save a Species Walk campaign in April 2016; scientists walked 300 km to raise money for collection of seeds to be prepared and stored at the Australian PlantBank at the Australian Botanic Garden, Mount Annan.

References

marginata
Flora of New South Wales
Plants described in 1990
Taxa named by Barry John Conn